Survivors  is the debut album by British heavy metal band Samson. It was released in 1979 and, although vocalist Bruce Dickinson appears as a band member on the cover sheet, the album was completed before he joined the band, with guitarist Paul Samson on vocal duty. The re-issue on CD of the album features seven bonus tracks with Dickinson singing some tracks from the original release.

Track listing
All tracks by Paul Samson and John McCoy, except "Tomorrow or Yesterday" by Paul Samson

Bonus tracks on 2001 CD re-issue

Bonus tracks on 2001 CD re-issue with Bruce Dickinson singing

Personnel

Band members
 Paul Samson – guitar, vocals
 Chris Aylmer – bass guitar 
 Thunderstick – drums
 Bruce Dickinson - vocals on bonus tracks (re-issue)

Additional musicians
John McCoy - bass, producer
Colin Towns - keyboards

References

1979 debut albums
Samson (band) albums